XFL Draft may refer to:

2001 XFL Draft, the only draft for the first XFL professional American football league
2020 XFL Draft, the inaugural draft for the rebooted XFL professional American football league